O3 may refer to:

O3, the molecular formula for ozone
O3, the 1993 debut album by the techno band Sunscreem
O3 A Trilogy, a 2008 concept album trilogy by progressive metal band Dominici
O3 star, in stellar classification, a subclass of type O stars
 O-3, the pay grade for the following officer ranks in the U.S. uniformed services:
 Captain in the Army, Marine Corps, Air Force, and Space Force
 Lieutenant in the Navy, Coast Guard, Public Health Service Commissioned Corps, and NOAA Commissioned Officer Corps
O3 Entertainment, a video game publisher
Haplogroup O3 (Y-DNA), a Y-DNA Haplogroup
Oldershaw O-3, glider
USS O-3 (SS-64), a 1917 United States O class submarine
Otoyol 3, a Turkish motorway from Edirne to Istanbul
Oskarshamn 3, unit 3 at Oskarshamn Nuclear Power Plant in Sweden
 O3 (album), a 2008 album by Son of Dave
 LNER Class O3, a class of British steam locomotives

See also
 03 (disambiguation)
 Ö3, Austrian radio station
 3O (disambiguation)